Events in the year 1886 in Brazil.

Incumbents
Monarch – Pedro II
Prime Minister – Baron of Cotegipe

Events
unknown date: The Brazilian arboreal mouse (Rhagomys rufescens) is described for the first time by zoologists.

Births
April 19: Manuel Bandeira, poet (died 1968)
September 1: Tarsila do Amaral, artist (died 1973)]

Deaths

References

1886 in Brazil
Years of the 19th century in Brazil
Brazil
Brazil